Anucha Kitphongsri (born May 23, 1983), simply known as Boy, is a Thai retired professional footballer who plays as a left-back.

He played for BEC Tero Sasana in the ASEAN Club Championship 2003, where the club finished runners'-up.

International career

Chayapat was a part of Thailand's squads in the 2012 AFF Suzuki Cup and the winning team in the 2014 AFF Suzuki Cup. In the former tournament Chayapat scored one of the goals of the tournament against Philippines dribbling past two defenders and the goalkeeper to score in a 2-1 win.

International goals

International goals

Under-19

Thailand

Honours

Club
BEC Tero Sasana
 Thai League Cup: 2014
 Toyota Premier Cup: 2015

International
Thailand U-19
 AFF U-20 Youth Championship: 2002

Thailand
 ASEAN Football Championship: 2014

Individual
 ASEAN Football Championship Best XI: 2012
 ASEAN Football Federation Best XI: 2013

References

External links
 Profile at Goal

1983 births
Living people
Anucha Kitphongsri
Anucha Kitphongsri
Association football fullbacks
Anucha Kitphongsri
Anucha Kitphongsri
Anucha Kitphongsri
Anucha Kitphongsri
Anucha Kitphongsri
Anucha Kitphongsri
Anucha Kitphongsri
Anucha Kitphongsri
Anucha Kitphongsri
Footballers at the 2002 Asian Games
Anucha Kitphongsri
Southeast Asian Games medalists in football
Competitors at the 2001 Southeast Asian Games
Anucha Kitphongsri